Holme Moor & Clean Moor is a 10.8 hectare (26.7 acre) biological Site of Special Scientific Interest south of Wiveliscombe in Somerset, notified in 1987.

Holme Moor and Clean Moor support a range of habitats associated with high water tables. Swamp and calcareous flush plant communities with a very restricted distribution in Somerset are present. Further diversity is provided by areas of marshy
grassland and broadleaved semi-natural woodland. An unusual feature of the ground flora is the abundance of Marsh-marigold (Caltha palustris).

References

External links 
Holme Moor and Clean Moor Special area of Conservation

Sites of Special Scientific Interest in Somerset
Sites of Special Scientific Interest notified in 1987